Eacles ormondei is a moth of the  family Saturniidae. It is found in tropical America.

Subspecies
Eacles ormondei ormondei (Mexico)
Eacles ormondei janzeni Brechlin & Meister, 2011 (Nicaragua)
Eacles ormondei niepelti Draudt, 1930 (Ecuador)
Eacles ormondei peruviana Bouvier, 1927 (Ecuador)
Eacles ormondei vanschaycki Brechlin & Meister, 2011 (Costa Rica)
Eacles ormondei violacea Lemaire, 1975 (Ecuador)
Eacles ormondei yucatanensis Lemaire, 1988 (Mexico)

References

Moths described in 1889
Ceratocampinae